Chimay is a city and municipality of Wallonia located in the province of Hainaut, Belgium. In 2006, Chimay had a population of 9,774. The area is 197.10 km2 which gives a population density of 50 inhabitants per km2. It is the source of the Oise River.

In the administrative district of Thuin, the municipality was created with a merger of 14 communes in 1977. The Trappist monastery of Scourmont Abbey in the town is famous for the Chimay Brewery.

Toponymy
The etymology of the name is ultimately, via Vulgar Latin, from the Proto-Celtic word koimos meaning "pretty, pleasant".

Subdivisions
The Walloon names of the place names are in brackets and italics.
Baileux (Balieu)
Bailièvre (Bailleve)
Bourlers (Bourlé)
Chimay (Chimai)
Forges (Foidjes)
L'Escaillère (L'Ecayire)
Lompret (Lompré)
Rièzes (Rieze)
Robechies (Robchiye)
Saint-Remy (Sint-Rmey)
Salles (Sale)
Vaulx (Vå)
Villers-la-Tour (Vilé-al-Tour)
Virelles (Virele)

Demographics

Attractions
Chimay Castle, the château of the princes of Chimay
Lake Virelles
The source of the Oise
Chimay has traditionally hosted an annual motor racing event, run on a street circuit formed from local public roads. From the 1920s to 1960s the event was run for contemporary Grand Prix and sportscar categories, and included the famous Grand Prix des Frontières. In recent times, while the event has persisted it has been run for historic race series. The track briefly lost its licence in 2006 related to safety fears, but has since had it reinstated.

Chimay Trappist beers and cheeses are produced in the town by the Chimay Brewery, run by the Trappist monks of Scourmont Abbey, and are internationally renowned.

Notable people
 Daniel van Buyten (b. 1978), football player
 Émile Coulonvaux (1892–1966), politician
 François Duval (b. 1980), rally car driver
 Jean Froissart (c.1337-c.1405), medieval historian
 Georges Hostelet (1875–1960), mathematician, philosopher, and sociologist
 François-Joseph-Philippe de Riquet (1771–1843), Prince of Chimay, and his wife Thérésa Tallien (1773–1835), French social figure

Twin cities/towns
 Ramsgate, United Kingdom
 Conflans-Sainte-Honorine, France

References

External links

 Official website
 Chimay at the Union of Cities and Municipalities of Wallonia
 chimay.be
 atheneeroyaldechimay.free.fr

 
Cities in Wallonia
Municipalities of Hainaut (province)